Perlyovka is a rural locality (a selo) and the administrative center of Perlyovskoye Rural Settlement, Semiluksky District, Voronezh Oblast, Russia. The population was 1,038 as of 2010. There are 46 streets.

Geography 
Perlyovka is located 21 km northwest of Semiluki (the district's administrative centre) by road. Chistaya Polyana is the nearest rural locality.

References 

Rural localities in Semiluksky District